Diocese of Mostar may refer to:

 Roman Catholic Diocese of Mostar, common name of the Roman Catholic Diocese of Mostar-Duvno, with seat in the city of Mostar
 Serbian Orthodox Diocese of Mostar, former common name of the current Serbian Orthodox Eparchy of Zahumlje and Herzegovina, when its seat was in the city of Mostar

See also
 Mostar (disambiguation)
Catholic Church in Bosnia and Herzegovina
Eastern Orthodoxy in Bosnia and Herzegovina
Diocese of Banja Luka (disambiguation)
Diocese of Sarajevo (disambiguation)
Diocese of Trebinje (disambiguation)